Adventure River was a water park located in Memphis, Tennessee. It opened in 1985 and closed in 1998.

Information
The park included a beach, a wave pool, concession stands, and several water slides.  The most well known slide was named Geronimo.  It featured live music concerts, including many local musicians and "Dive in movies", which patrons could watch from the wave pool. Other attractions included several small rides in a kiddie area.

Opening
It was open from Memorial Day weekend through Labor Day weekend each year.

Closing
The park, which had become "Wild Water and Wheels" in its later years with the addition of go-carts, closed in September 1998 due to decreasing attendance, rising insurance costs, and the rise in property value in the area.

Land
Much of the land formerly housing the park is now used as an osprey breeding area and industrial park which houses regional offices for Johnson Controls, Terminix, Burger King, and Trugreen among others.

Location
Adventure River was located in Memphis, Tennessee. It was located just northeast of the I-40 and Whitten Road junction.

References

1985 establishments in Tennessee
1998 disestablishments in Tennessee
Defunct amusement parks in the United States
Landmarks in Tennessee
Buildings and structures in Memphis, Tennessee
Water parks in Tennessee
Amusement parks opened in 1985
Amusement parks closed in 1998